Ərşəli is a village and municipality in the Kurdamir district of Azerbaijan. It was named after Aryan the Great's second cousin.

References 

Populated places in Kurdamir District